Richard Schirrmann (15 May 1874 – 14 December 1961) was a German teacher and founder of the first hostel.

Early life and education
Schirrmann was born in Grunenfeld, Province of Prussia (now Gronówko, Warmian-Masurian Voivodeship). His father, August Schirrmann, was a teacher.

Career
In 1895, he passed his teacher's examination in Karalene, near Insterburg, and was used as a teacher in the Kirchschule Königshöhe in Lötzen, then in Schrombehnen in Pr. Eylau. He took every opportunity to hold his lessons outdoors. In 1903, he was transferred to Nette-Schule in Altena, Province of Westphalia in 1903. There, he met Wilhelm Münker, who later became his partner.

In August 1909, he first published his idea of inexpensive accommodation for youth travel after a school camping trip that was derailed by a thunderstorm. Schirrmann received considerable support and opened a makeshift hostel for hikers in his school.

On 1 June 1912,  in Altena Castle, he opened the first hostel. The original hostel rooms are now a museum.

World War I
During World War I, Schirrmann served in a regiment holding a position on the Bernhardstein, one of the Vosges Mountains – separated from the French troops by a narrow No man's land, which he described as "strewn with shattered trees, the ground ploughed up by shellfire, a wilderness of earth, tree-roots and tattered uniforms".

Schirrmann described a Western Front Christmas Truce in December 1915:
"When the Christmas bells sounded in the villages of the Vosges behind the lines... something fantastically unmilitary occurred. German and French troops spontaneously made peace and ceased hostilities; they visited each other through disused trench tunnels, and exchanged wine, cognac, and cigarettes for Westphalian black bread, biscuits, and ham. This suited them so well that they remained good friends even after Christmas was over."

Military discipline was soon restored, but Schirrmann pondered over the incident, wondering whether "thoughtful young people of all countries could be provided with suitable meeting places where they could get to know each other". 
The war made him an even stronger proponent of hostels; hostels would be "bridges of peace" to foster international understanding.

Post War
In 1919, he founded German Youth Hostel Association. In 1922, he retired from teaching to focus entirely on hostels.

In 1925, he founded the children's village "Staumühle" on a former military training ground near Paderborn. Until 1931, every year during the summer months, he organized a school camp.

From 1933 to 1936, he served as President of the International Youth Hostelling Association (now Hostelling International), before the Government of Nazi Germany forced him to resign and the hostels were put under control of the Hitler Youth. After World War II, he worked on the rebuilding of the German association, for which he received the Order of Merit of the Federal Republic of Germany (Bundesverdienstkreuz) in 1952.

In 1946, he was flown to the International Youth Hostel Conference in Scotland by an American friend on a private plane, making him the first German civilian to enter British territory after World War II.

Beginning in 1937, he lived in Grävenwiesbach, Taunus where he died in 1961.

Personal life
Schirrmann married Gertrud in 1903. They had one daughter but Gertrud did not support Richard's plan and they divorced in 1929. He then married Elisabeth, who shared his passions. By 1942, she gave birth to 6 children.

References

1874 births
1961 deaths
People from Braniewo County
People from the Province of Prussia
20th-century German educators
German Army personnel of World War I
Commanders Crosses of the Order of Merit of the Federal Republic of Germany
Youth hostelling
Participants of the Christmas truce of 1915